Noel Brotherston (18 November 1956 – 6 May 1995) was an international footballer for Northern Ireland.

Club career
A winger, Brotherston played in the Football League for Tottenham, Blackburn Rovers, Bury, and Scarborough.

Noel was well remembered for his characteristic hairstyle that seemed to emphasise his jinking runs down the wing. He was a fans' favourite at Blackburn.

International career
Brotherston made his debut for Northern Ireland in a May 1980 friendly match against Scotland and won 27 international caps, scoring three goals. He represented his country in three FIFA World Cup qualification matches and played at the 1982 World Cup.

Brotherston played in a famous 1–0 win for Northern Ireland over Israel that helped the team to qualify for the World Cup finals for the first time in 24 years. He also scored the winning goal against Wales in 1980 to give Northern Ireland the Home Internationals Championship trophy in the Irish Football Association's centenary year.

Personal life
Brotherston grew up in the town of Dundonald, in the east of Belfast. He lived in Bright Street, East Belfast when he was a small boy.

He became a painter and decorator in Blackburn when he retired as a player. He died of a heart attack aged just 38.

References

External links

 
 Noel Brotherston Northern Ireland's Footballing Greats
 Noel Brotherston Profile  Tottenham Hotspur

1956 births
1995 deaths
1982 FIFA World Cup players
Blackburn Rovers F.C. players
Bury F.C. players
Association football wingers
Association footballers from Northern Ireland
House painters
Northern Ireland international footballers
Northern Ireland under-21 international footballers
Expatriate footballers in England
Association footballers from Belfast
Scarborough F.C. players
English Football League players
Tottenham Hotspur F.C. players
People from Dundonald, County Down